

1960 

 3 June - Phalaborwa Gate officially opens, replacing Malopene Gate.
 3 June – Olifants Rest Camp officially opens. It replaces the 'old' Olifants Rest Camp, which is renamed Balule.
 5 June – An outbreak of anthrax rapidly spreads throughout the area north of the Letaba River. 1,054 carcasses are found and burnt before the epidemic ends in October 1960.

1961 
 20 April – Warden Steyn retires. He is replaced by the chief biologist, A. M. Brynard, who takes the new title of Nature Conservator.
 
 14 October – White rhinos re-introduced to the Park. The first batch of 4 that arrives from Natal are released in a special enclosure near Pretoriuskop.

1962 
 9-12 April – The first comprehensive aerial census of elephants yields a total of 1,601, mainly north of the Olifants River.

1964 
 25 May - Due to a severe drought that started in 1962, a campaign to cull 100 Letaba River hippos starts. This campaign ends in August 1964.

1965 
 30 November - A symposium, attended by many South African biologists, is convened in Pretoria by the National Parks Board on the "over-protection" of nature. Acting on recommendations emanating from this conference, the National Parks Board decides in March 1966 to commence with the culling of seven species (elephant, buffalo, hippo, giraffe, zebra, wildebeest and impala).
 15 December - Liquor sales started in all rest camps (except Orpen, Malelane and Crocodile Bridge), ending a near 40-year prohibition.

1967 
 4 March – Ranger D. Swart reports seeing a group of 6 bat-eared foxes (Otocyon megalotis) near Shingwedzi. Previously thought to occur only in the more arid regions of western Southern Africa, this is the first sighting of these animals in the Park. Further sightings in June 1967 and early 1969 confirm that bat-eared foxes do indeed occur in the Park.

1968 
 1 January – Two trains collide near Randspruit between Skukuza and Crocodile Bridge in the worst train disaster in the park. Fourteen people die and 38 are seriously injured.
 December – A game-driving operation, Operation Numbi, starts in order to remove animals from a 6000 hectare excised section of the Park north of Numbi Gate. This area of the Park, around Numbi Kop, was exchanged for other areas due to the rerouting of the Selati railway line which ran through the Park.

1969 
 1 February – Commercial Airlines (Comair) starts the first scheduled flights from Johannesburg and Phalaborwa to Skukuza with a DC3 aircraft.

See also 
History of the Kruger National Park
The Kruger National Park in the 1950s
The Kruger National Park in the 1970s
The Kruger National Park in the 1980s

References 

Kruger National Park